Emma Louise Lobb (born 16 July 1991), who performs as Emma Louise, is an Australian indie pop singer-songwriter from Cairns. She is best known for her 2011 debut single "Jungle". Two studio albums, Vs Head vs Heart (March 2013) and Supercry (July 2016), have reached the ARIA Albums Chart top 15. At the ARIA Music Awards of 2013 she was nominated for Best Female Artist.

Biography

1991–2012: Early life and EPs
Emma Louise Lobb, was born in July 1991, she grew up in Cairns. Lobb told ABC news "My dad bought me my first guitar when I was six and I wrote my first song when I was in grade nine, which was about a dog. I started to write serious songs… when I was in grade ten."

At the 2007 Queensland Music Awards Lobb won Best Secondary School song and the People's Choice Award with the guitar-driven ballad, "Kim's Song" despite the song only being available on her MySpace 

Lobb issued a five-track extended play, Autumn Tongues, in 2008. It was recorded with Mark Myers at Pegasus Studios, Cairns. She moved from Cairns to Brisbane in early 2010 where she initially worked as an events manager. In the following year described her influences, "My biggest musical role models are Missy Higgins, Josh Pyke, Sarah Blasko and Lior. Missy Higgins really inspired me to start writing music."

In April 2011, Lobb released another EP, Full Hearts & Empty Rooms, and one of its four tracks, "Jungle", received high rotation on the national youth radio, Triple J. The EP reached the ARIA Singles Chart top 100. During that year she toured in support of Boy & Bear. She was nominated for the 2011 J Award in the Unearthed talent contest for artist of the year. On the Triple J Hottest 100, 2011, "Jungle" was listed at No. 23 by the station's listeners in its on line poll.

2013–present: Studio albums 
In March 2013, Lobb released her debut studio album, Vs Head vs Heart, which peaked at No. 12 on the ARIA Albums Chart. She was nominated for Best Female Artist at the ARIA Music Awards of 2013. She has won categories at the Queensland Music Awards in that year. Also in 2013 year German DJ and producer, Wankelmut, remixed Lobb's track, "Jungle", which was released as "My Head Is a Jungle". It subsequently reached double platinum status in Italy and top 30 in Germany. International fashion house Yves Saint Laurent used  "Jungle" in their worldwide advertising campaign for Black Opium perfume in 2014. 

In 2014, She collaborated with Australian electronic duo, Flight Facilities, featuring on their single, "Two Bodies", released in September 2014, which reached the ARIA top 100 and was placed at No. 39 on Triple J Hottest 100, 2014.

In 2015 Lobb was the opening act for English singer, Sam Smith, on the Oceania leg of their In the Lonely Hour Tour. She was also the main support on Smith's second Australian tour, during November–December of that year. 

In 2015, Lobb signed with Liberation Music She issued her second solo album, Supercry, on 11 July 2016, which reached No. 14.

In 2016, Lobb appeared in an advertising campaign for South Australian Tourism Commission. The ad has her singing a version of the INXS song, "Never Tear Us Apart". 

In September 2018, Lobb released her third studio album, Lilac Everything: A Project by Emma Louise

Personal life
Lobb married Canadian musician Tobias Jesso Jr. in January 2019; they have since had a child.

Discography

Studio albums

Extended plays

Singles

As lead artist

As featured artist

Other album appearances

Awards and nominations

AIR Awards
The Australian Independent Record Awards (commonly known informally as AIR Awards) is an annual awards night to recognise, promote and celebrate the success of Australia's Independent Music sector.

|-
| rowspan="2" | AIR Awards of 2011
| Herself
| Breakthrough Independent Artist
| 
|-
| Full Hearts & Empty Rooms
| Best Independent Single/EP
| 
|-
| AIR Awards of 2019
| Lilac Everything
| Best Independent Album
| 
|-

APRA Awards
The APRA Awards are presented annually from 1982 by the Australasian Performing Right Association (APRA), "honouring composers and songwriters". They commenced in 1982.

! 
|-
| 2012 
| "Jungle"
| Song of the Year
| 
| 
|-

ARIA Music Awards
The ARIA Music Awards is an annual awards ceremony that recognises excellence, innovation, and achievement across all genres of Australian music.

|-
| 2013
| Vs Head Vs Heart
| Best Female Artist
| 
|-

J Awards
The J Awards are an annual series of Australian music awards that were established by the Australian Broadcasting Corporation's youth-focused radio station Triple J. They commenced in 2005.

|-
| J Awards of 2011
| Herself
| Unearthed Artist of the Year
|

Queensland Music Awards
The Queensland Music Awards (previously known as Q Song Awards) are annual awards celebrating Queensland, Australia's brightest emerging artists and established legends. They commenced in 2006.

 (wins only)
|-
| rowspan="2" | 2007
| rowspan="2" | "Kim's Song"
| Secondary School Song of the Year
| 
|-
| The Courier-Mail People's Choice Award 
| 
|-
| rowspan="3" | 2011
| rowspan="2" | "Jungle"
| Song of the Year
| 
|-
| Pop Song of the Year
| 
|-
| "1000 Sundowns" 
| Folk Song of the Year
| 
|-
| rowspan="3" | 2013
| vs Head vs Heart
| Album of the Year
| 
|-
| herself
| Export Achievement Award
| 
|-
| herself (for "Boy)
| The Courier-Mail People's Choice Award Most Popular Female
| 
|-

Vanda & Young Global Songwriting Competition
The Vanda & Young Global Songwriting Competition is an annual competition that "acknowledges great songwriting whilst supporting and raising money for Nordoff-Robbins" and is coordinated by Albert Music and APRA AMCOS. It commenced in 2009.

|-
| 2016
| "Underflow"
| Vanda & Young Global Songwriting Competition
| style="background:silver;"| 2nd
|-

References

 
1991 births
21st-century Australian singers
21st-century Australian women singers
Australian women singer-songwriters
Australian women musicians
Frenchkiss Records artists
Living people
People from Cairns